Fishwife was an American punk rock band from San Diego, California, active from 1990 to 1993 and consisting of Ryan Foxe (vocals), Matt Ohlin (bass guitar), Gar Wood (guitar), and Chris Prescott (drums).

Fishwife broke up in 1993 when Foxe moved to New York City to attend college. Prescott, Ohlin and Wood subsequently formed the band Tanner, and Foxe later sang in the garage rock group The Let Downs.

References 

Musical groups from San Diego
Punk rock groups from California
Musical groups established in 1990
Musical groups disestablished in 1993